The National Book Development Board, abbreviated as NBDB, is an agency of the Philippine government under the Department of Education formed through Republic Act No. 8047 or the Book Publishing Industry Development Act, which was responsible for promoting the continuing development of the book-publishing industry in the Philippines, with the active participation of the private sector. NBDB's operational plan are: grassroots capacity-building initiatives, investment and trade promotion activities, public campaigns and institutionalized research and data gathering.

Mission
To promote the continuing development of the book publishing industry, with the active participation of the private sector, to ensure an adequate supply of affordable, quality- produced books not only for the domestic market but also for export.

Vision 
National Book Development Board is the leading catalyst for building a culture of reading and authorship as well as an environment for the growth of the book publishing industry towards making it globally competitive.

History
The birth of the NBDB was a long struggle that started in the halls of Congress by legislators for ten (10) years or more who shared a vision and desire to see the growth of the book publishing industry of the Philippines through democratization of the supply of educational materials to public schools and non-imposition of tariffs and taxes. The first hearing commenced on July 25, 1994, and ended on June 2, 1995, when his excellency, former president Fidel V. Ramos signed into law the Republic Act No. 8047 or also known as the “Book Publishing Industry Development Act” which is a consolidation of Senate Bill No. 252 authored by Senator Edgardo J. Angara and House Bill No. 12614. The Republic Act 8047 was an amendment and repeal to the Executive Order 492 series of 1991 which formed the Instructional Materials Development Center under the Department of Education, Culture and Sports (DECS). The National Book Development Board which was referred to as the “Board” was created through the enactment of Republic Act No. 8047 under the administrative supervision of the Office of the President. Its first chairman was Atty. Dominador D. Buhain.

Its first office was then located at A. Ma. Regidor Street, Area XI, University of the Philippines, Diliman, Quezon City from 1995 to 2007. After a few months, it was transferred to 2nd Floor, National Printing Office, EDSA corner NIA Northside Road, Diliman, Quezon City from 2007 until 2012. NBDB then moved at Unit 2401, Prestige Tower, F. Ortigas Jr. Road (formerly Emerald Avenue), Ortigas Center, Pasig from 2013 to March 2019. Then it had a short stay at 4th Floor Dorm E, Department of Education Complex, Pasig from April 2019 to December 2019. Starting January 2020, NBDB's new office is currently located at 3rd and 4th Floors, Regalado Hive Building, Regalado Avenue, Fairview, Quezon City.

Organizational structure 
The National Book Development Board was composed of: The Governing Board and the Secretariat.

Governing board

The governing board assumes responsibility for carrying out and implementing the policies, purposes and objectives provided in the Republic Act No. 8047. It was composed of eleven (11) members. Five (5) representatives were chosen from the Department of Education, Culture and Sports (DECS), Department of Trade and Industry (DTI), Department of Science and Technology (DOST), National Commission for Culture and the Arts (NCCA), and nominees by the Commission on Higher Education (CHED) and Technical Education Skills Development Authority (TESDA) from the academe and training institutions; and, six (6) representatives from the nominees of organizations of private book publishers, printers, writers, book industry related activities, students and the private education sector, preferably representatives of the three main islands of the country in view of the substantial progress made by other regions in the book publishing industry. The appointees to the board shall be one of the three (3) nominees of the concerned nationwide organizations duly incorporated with the Securities and Exchange Commission (SEC) and with membership, whenever feasible, in all the cities and provinces throughout the country. The members of the board shall elect a chair from among themselves. The DECS representative in the board shall be the ex-officio vice chair of the board. Its current chair is Dante Francis Ang II.

Secretariat

The National Book Development Board have a permanent secretariat under an executive officer, who shall be appointed by the board. The executive officer have the authority and responsibility for the day-to-day management and direction of the operations and affairs of the board. The secretariat executes, administer and implement the policies and measures approved by the board. The structural and functional organization, compensation plan, and the staffing pattern of the secretariat shall be approved by the board upon the recommendation of the executive officer. The board may create, abolish, merge, or otherwise reorganize positions therein as may be necessary for the economical, effective and efficient discharge of its functions and responsibilities subject to existing laws.

Affiliations 
NBDB is an agency with wide array of external partnerships, affairs and linkages with different government organizations and academic institutions.

 List of Registered Publishers (For full list of registered publishers, see: here )
 List of Registered Booksellers (For full list of registered booksellers, see: here)
 List of Registered Book Importers (For full list of registered book importers, see: here)
 List of Registered Book Printers (For full list of registered book printers, see: here)
 List of Registered Individuals (For full list of registered individuals, see: here)

Grants, awards and incentives 
The National Book Development Board recognizes the vital contribution of the different publishing companies by granting awards and incentives to its registered members and entities such as: National Book Development Trust Fund Act, NBDB Translation Subsidy Program, Tax and Duty Free Importation of Raw Materials (TADFI), EO 226: Omnibus Investment Code of 1987 (Tax Holiday), National Book Awards, National Children's Book Awards, and Filipino Readers’ Choice Awards.

Trainings, reading campaigns and book fairs 
NBDB promotes reading and writing literacy for all ages by conducting several local and international trainings, reading campaigns and book fairs such as: Booklatan sa Bayan, Training the Trainers for the module “Writing Stories for Children”, Children's Book Summit, Philippine International Literary Festival, Rights Management, Book Industry Summit, Read Aloud, Read Pinoy Video Campaign, Book Fiesta, Booklatan Book Fair, and the Manila International Book Fair (MIBF). It is also an active partner and participant of the World Book and Copyright Day, Kuala Lumpur Trade & Copyright Centre (KLTCC) Fair in Malaysia, Frankfurt Book Fair (FBF) in Germany, London Book Fair (LBF) in United Kingdom, and the 85th PEN International Congress.

It also has its own studies and publications such as the: Readership Survey, The Philippine Book Publishing Industry in Figures, Bookwatch, and Copyright Watch.

Accomplishments 
As of January 31, 2021, a total of 736 entities were already registered with the National Book Development Board. 524 of which were active registrants.

See also
Republic Act No. 9521 (National Book Development Trust Fund Act)
Executive Order No. 119 (National Book Policy)
Executive Order No. 226 (Omnibus Investments Code of 1987)
Executive Order No. 528 (Prescribing uniform fees for copies of official records and documents or for certificates furnished private persons and entities)
Executive Order No. 885 (Modifying the nomenclature and the rates of duty on imported Educational, Technical, Scientific and Historical or Cultural books under Section 104 of the Tariff and Customs code of 1978 (Presidential Decree No. 1464), as amended
Republic Act No. 8293 (Intellectual Property Code of the Philippines)
Executive Order No. 189 (Transferring the National Book Development Board from the Office of the President to the Department of Education)
Proclamation No. 120 (Declaring the Month of June 1999 and every year thereafter as Philippine Book Development Month)
Proclamation No. 1436 (amending Proclamation No. 120 series of 199, by resetting the celebration of the Philippine Book Development Month from June to November of every year starting 2008)

External links

Department of Education (Philippines)